USS Mission Bay (CVE-59) was a  of the United States Navy. She was named after Mission Bay, located northwest of San Diego. Launched in May 1943, and commissioned in September, she served as a transport carrier, ferrying aircraft to bases in Europe, Africa, and Asia. She also participated in the Battle of the Atlantic, protecting convoys and conducting antisubmarine patrols. Notably, she escorted President Roosevelt on-board the cruiser  as he returned from the Yalta Conference. She was decommissioned in February 1947, when she was mothballed in the Atlantic Reserve Fleet. Ultimately, she was sold for scrapping in April 1959.

Design and description

Mission Bay was a Casablanca-class escort carrier, the most numerous type of aircraft carriers ever built, and designed specifically to be mass-produced using prefabricated sections, in order to replace heavy early war losses. She displaced  standard,  with a full load. She was powered with two Uniflow reciprocating steam engines, which drove two shafts, providing , thus enabling her to make . Her compact size necessitated the installment of an aircraft catapult at her bow, and there were two aircraft elevators to facilitate movement of aircraft between the flight and hangar deck: one each fore and aft.

One /38 caliber dual-purpose gun was mounted on the stern. Anti-aircraft defense was provided by eight  Bofors anti-aircraft guns in single mounts, as well as twelve  Oerlikon cannons, which were mounted around the perimeter of the deck. By the end of the war, Casablanca-class carriers had been modified to carry thirty 20–mm cannons, and the amount of 40–mm guns had been doubled to sixteen, by putting them into twin mounts. These modifications were in response to increasing casualties due to kamikaze attacks. Casablanca-class escort carriers were designed to carry 27 aircraft, but the hangar deck could accommodate more.

Construction
The escort carrier was laid down on 28 December 1942, under a Maritime Commission contract, MC hull 1096, by Kaiser Shipbuilding Company, Vancouver, Washington. She was launched on 26 May 1943; sponsored by Mrs. James McDonald; transferred to the United States Navy and commissioned on 13 September 1943, with Captain William Lehigh Rees in command.

Service history

Upon being commissioned, Mission Bay underwent a shakedown cruise down the West Coast to San Diego. She departed San Diego on 15 November bound for the East Coast. Passing through the Panama Canal, arriving at Portsmouth, Virginia on 5 December. There, she was assigned to participate in the Battle of the Atlantic, escorting convoys and hunting German U-boats. She left the East Coast on 26 December, escorting convoys on their way to Casablanca, French Morocco. She arrived on 19 January 1944. She then sailed back, returning to Portsmouth on 8 February.

Her next cruise started on 20 February, when she departed New York City, transporting Army planes and crew, bound for India. Along the way, she made stops at Recife, Brazil, and Cape Town, Union of South Africa. She arrived at Karachi on 29 March, where she unloaded her cargo. She then proceeded back to her home port, arriving back at Portsmouth by 12 May. She arrived on 6 June, departed on 8 June, and arrived back at New York on 17 June. As she entered New York Harbor, she collided with a dredge, which resulted in significant damage to the hull. She arrived at Portsmouth on 22 June, where repairs were conducted throughout the month of July. During this time period, Commander William Ellis Gentner, Jr. took over command of the ship.

On 8 September, she departed, bound for the South Atlantic. After refueling at Dakar, French West Africa on 20 September, she began antisubmarine operations, which lasted throughout the month of November. She arrived back at Portsmouth on 25 November. On 21 December, she left harbor, and proceeded to the Caribbean, where she conducted exercises in the strait between Florida and Cuba. These exercises and miscellaneous tasks took her until February 1945. She was then ordered to sail to Gibraltar, where she would meet the heavy cruiser  which was carrying President Franklin D. Roosevelt and his entourage back from the Yalta Conference. She rendezvoused with the cruiser on 23 February, and escorted the ship as it passed through the open Atlantic. She then left the convoy, mooring at Bermuda on 27 February, before returning to Portsmouth on 9 March.

She departed again on 29 March, and conducted a final antisubmarine sweep of the North Atlantic. Having found no contacts, she anchored off of New York on 14 May. She then cruised off the East Coast, training pilots and conducting pilot qualifications, before she proceeded to Guantanamo Bay on 19 July. She arrived at Quonset Point on 2 August, where she continued training pilots until December, well after the Japanese surrender. On 19 December, she was assigned to the 16th Reserve Fleet, based at Norfolk, Virginia. She was fully decommissioned on 21 February 1947, and mothballed as part of the Atlantic Reserve Fleet, albeit she still stayed with the 16th Reserve Fleet. On 30 November 1949, she was moved up to the Bayonne Naval Supply Depot, New Jersey, where she lay until she was struck from the Navy list on 1 September 1958. She was sold to Hugo Neu Corp on 30 April 1959, and towed to Japan, where she was broken up, starting January 1960.

References

Sources

Online sources

Bibliography

External links 

 

 

Casablanca-class escort carriers
World War II escort aircraft carriers of the United States
Ships built in Vancouver, Washington
1943 ships
S4-S2-BB3 ships